tert-Butyl isocyanide is an organic compound with the formula Me3CNC (Me = methyl, CH3).  It is an isocyanide, commonly called isonitrile or carbylamine, as defined by the functional group C≡N-R.  tert-Butyl isocyanide, like most alkyl isocyanides, is a reactive colorless liquid with an extremely unpleasant odor.  It forms stable complexes with transition metals and can insert into metal-carbon bonds. 

tert-Butyl isocyanide is prepared by a Hofmann carbylamine reaction.  In this conversion, a dichloromethane solution of tert-butylamine is treated with chloroform and aqueous sodium hydroxide in the presence of catalytic amount of the phase transfer catalyst benzyltriethylammonium chloride. 
Me3CNH2  +  CHCl3  +  3 NaOH   →   Me3CNC  +  3 NaCl  +  3 H2O

tert-Butyl isocyanide is isomeric with pivalonitrile, also known as tert-butyl cyanide. The difference, as with all carbylamine analogs of nitriles, is that the bond joining the CN functional group to the parent molecule is made on the nitrogen, not the carbon.

Coordination chemistry

By virtue of the lone electron pair on carbon, isocyanides serves as ligands in coordination chemistry, especially with metals in the 0, +1, and +2 oxidation states.  tert-Butyl isocyanide has been shown to stabilize metals in unusual oxidation states, such as Pd(I).  
 Pd(dba)2  +  PdCl2(C6H5CN)2  +  4 t-BuNC   →   [(t-BuNC)2PdCl]2  +  2 dba  +  2 C6H5CN
tert-Butyl isocyanide can form hepta-coordinate homoleptic complexes, despite having a large t-Bu group, which is held far away from the metal center because of the linearity of the M-C≡N-C linkages.

tert-Butyl isocycanide forms complexes that are stoichiometrically analogous to certain binary metal carbonyl complexes, such as Fe2(CO)9 and Fe2(tBuNC)9.

Safety
Tert-butyl isocyanide is toxic.  Its behavior is similar to that of its close electronic relative carbon monoxide.

References

Isocyanides
Ligands
Tert-butyl compounds
Foul-smelling chemicals